The Constant Gardener is a 2005 British-German drama thriller film directed by Fernando Meirelles. The screenplay by Jeffrey Caine is based on John le Carré's 2001 novel of the same name. The story follows Justin Quayle (Ralph Fiennes), a British diplomat in Kenya, as he tries to solve the murder of his wife Tessa (Rachel Weisz), an Amnesty activist, alternating with many flashbacks telling the story of their love.

Accolades

References

External links
 

Lists of accolades by film